Multiplicative may refer to:
Multiplication
Multiplicative function
Multiplicative group
Multiplicative identity
Multiplicative inverse
Multiplicative order
Multiplicative partition
Multiplicative case
 For the multiplicative numerals once, twice, and thrice, see English numerals